Tart-le-Haut is a former commune in the Côte-d'Or department in eastern France. On 1 January 2019, it was merged into the new commune Tart.

Population

See also
Communes of the Côte-d'Or department

References

Former communes of Côte-d'Or
Populated places disestablished in 2019